The 2021–22 Burundi Ligue A season, also known as the Primus Ligue for sponsorship reasons, was the 59th edition of the top flight football competition in Burundi. The season began on 14 August 2021 and ended on 14 May 2022. Le Messager Ngozi were the defending champion.

Flambeau du Centre won their first league title following 2-1 win against Athlético New Oil on the last day of the season.

Teams 
A total of sixteen clubs participate in this season. Thirteen teams from previous season and three new promoted sides.

Promoted from Ligue B
 Top Junior
 Flambeau de l'Est
 Les Crocos

Relegated from Ligue A
 Inter Star
 Les Eléphants
 Muzinga

Other changes
 Athlético Academy merged with Ligue B side New Oil FC to form Athlético New Oil.

Stadiums and locations

League table

References

Burundi Premier League seasons
Premier League
Premier League
Burundi
Burundi